Trainmeusel is a village in the Upper Franconian market municipality of Wiesenttal in the district of Forchheim in the German state of Bavaria.

Location 
The village lies within the Franconian Switzerland-Veldenstein Forest Nature Park, about 1.3 kilometres southwest of  Muggendorf on a Jurassic plateau of the Franconian Jura. The village may be reached by car from Muggendorf on the Kreisstrasse FO35. Its neighbouring villages in clockwise order are Muggendorf, Wohlmannsgesees, and Birkenreuth.

History 
Trainmeusel was probably founded in the 9th century. The village was first mentioned in 1137. Its name is derived from the Slavic Dragomysl and means "Dragomysl's place".

Today 
The village is rural in character, has no shops and one inn.

Near Trainmeusel is the Trainmeusel Spring, a spring formed between two layers of rock (Schichtquelle) which is protected as a natural monument.

References

External links 

Franconian Switzerland
Forchheim (district)
Wiesenttal